Several ships of the Royal Navy have been named HMS Phaeton or Phaëton after Phaëton, the son of Helios in Greek mythology:

 , a purpose-built fireship launched in 1691, was expended against the French Navy at La Hogue in 1692.
 , also a fireship, formerly a merchantman purchased in 1739, served as an escort during the War of Austrian Succession.
 , a frigate launched in 1782 which served during the Napoleonic Wars, created an incident in Nagasaki harbour, Japan, in 1808.
 , a 32-pounder armed sailing frigate launched in 1848, was converted in 1859 to screw propulsion.
 , launched 1883, was a  protected cruiser.
 , launched 1914, was an  light cruiser. She served in World War I.
 HMS Phaeton, launched 1934, was a  light cruiser transferred to the Royal Australian Navy and renamed . She was sunk by the German auxiliary cruiser  in World War II.

Royal Navy ship names